Oresti Kacurri (born 25 February 1998) is an Albanian professional footballer who plays as a midfielder for Greek Super League 2 club Chania.

Career statistics

Club

References

External links

1998 births
Living people
Albanian footballers
Football League (Greece) players
Super League Greece 2 players
Ergotelis F.C. players
Association football midfielders
Footballers from Heraklion
Greek footballers